Martin Gilbert is the name of:

Sir Martin Gilbert (1936–2015), British historian
Martin Gilbert (businessman) (born 1955), British businessman
Martin Gilbert (cyclist) (born 1982), Canadian cyclist

See also
Martin Gilbert Barrow (born 1944), Hong Kong politician